Deuel County is a county located in the U.S. state of Nebraska. As of the 2010 United States Census, the population was 1,941. Its county seat is Chappell. The county was formed in 1889 and named for Harry Porter Deuel, superintendent of the Union Pacific Railroad.

In the Nebraska license plate system, Deuel County is represented by the prefix 78 (it had the 78th-largest number of vehicles registered in the county when the license plate system was established in 1922).

Geography
Deuel County lies on the south side of Nebraska. Its southern boundary abuts the northern boundary line of the state of Colorado.

Since Deuel County lies in the western portion of Nebraska, its residents observe Mountain Time. The eastern portion of Nebraska observes Central Time.

Major highways

  Interstate 76
  Interstate 80
  U.S. Highway 30
  U.S. Highway 138
  U.S. Highway 385
  Nebraska Highway 27

Adjacent counties 

 Garden County - north
 Keith County - east
 Perkins County - southeast
 Sedgwick County, Colorado - south
 Cheyenne County - west

Demographics

As of the 2000 United States Census, there were 2,098 people, 908 households, and 601 families in the county. The population density was 5 people per square mile (2/km2). There were 1,032 housing units at an average density of 2 per square mile (1/km2).  The racial makeup of the county was 97.33% White, 0.05% Black or African American, 0.38% Native American, 0.38% Asian, 1.14% from other races, and 0.71% from two or more races. 2.72% of the population were Hispanic or Latino of any race. 36.3% were of German, 10.7% Irish, 10.2% English, 10.0% Swedish and 9.5% American ancestry.

There were 908 households, out of which 25.60% had children under the age of 18 living with them, 57.60% were married couples living together, 5.90% had a female householder with no husband present, and 33.80% were non-families. 31.20% of all households were made up of individuals, and 16.50% had someone living alone who was 65 years of age or older.  The average household size was 2.29 and the average family size was 2.87.

The county population contained 23.30% under the age of 18, 4.90% from 18 to 24, 24.40% from 25 to 44, 24.50% from 45 to 64, and 22.90% who were 65 years of age or older. The median age was 44 years. For every 100 females there were 94.80 males. For every 100 females age 18 and over, there were 95.50 males.

The median income for a household in the county was $32,981, and the median income for a family was $41,550. Males had a median income of $26,020 versus $19,479 for females. The per capita income for the county was $17,891. About 5.30% of families and 9.10% of the population were below the poverty line, including 12.40% of those under age 18 and 6.10% of those age 65 or over.

Communities

City 

 Chappell (county seat)

Village 

 Big Springs

Unincorporated community 
 Barton

Politics
Deuel County voters have been strongly Republican for decades. In no national election since 1936 has the county selected the Democratic Party candidate (as of 2020).

See also
 National Register of Historic Places listings in Deuel County, Nebraska

References

 
Nebraska counties
1889 establishments in Nebraska
Populated places established in 1889